Stepan Plyushkin is a fictional character in Nikolai Gogol's novel Dead Souls. He is a landowner who obsessively collects and saves everything he finds, to the point that when he wants to celebrate a deal with the protagonist Chichikov, he orders one of his serfs to find a cake that a visitor brought several years ago, scrape off the mold, and bring it to them. At the same time, his estate is incredibly inefficient; the cut wheat rots on the ground and any potential income is lost.

His surname is from the Russian word for 'cinnamon bun' (плюшка) or may be from 'plush' (плюш).

Background 

Plyushkin had two daughters and a son, but upon the death of his wife he became a suspicious miser. The younger daughter died and the other two siblings left home. When his daughter Aleksandra Stepanovna visited him several times with gifts and grandchildren, but received no money in return, she stopped visiting. When Chichikov meets Plyushkin, he mistakes him for the steward due to his ignoble dress.

Plyushkin syndrome 

Today in Russia, the name "Plyushkin" is semi-humorously applied to people who collect and amass various useless things, a behavior known as compulsive hoarding. Sometimes the terms "Plyushkin symptom" or "Plyushkin syndrome" are used to describe such people.

In English, the words "pack rat"  and hoarder are used for such people.

References

Russian culture
Compulsive hoarding
Literary characters introduced in 1842
Characters in Russian novels of the 19th century
Fictional characters with obsessive–compulsive disorder